McCauley or MacCauley may refer to:

Surname
McCauley (surname), an English-language surname with multiple etymological origins (also includes surname MacCauley)
List of people with the surnames MacCauley and McCauley

Places
 McCauley, Edmonton, an inner city neighbourhood located in Edmonton, Alberta, Canada
 McCauley, California, the former name of Foresta, California, USA
 McCauley, West Virginia, an unincorporated community in Hardy County, West Virginia, USA

Companies
McCauley Propeller Systems, an aircraft propeller manufacturer established in 1938

See also
Macaulay (disambiguation)
McAuley (disambiguation)
Cauley (surname)